The women's 100 metres event at the 2011 Summer Universiade was held on 16–17 August.

Medalists

Results

Heats
Qualification: First three in each heat (Q) and the next eight fastest (q) qualified for the quarterfinals.

Wind:Heat 1: -0.4 m/s, Heat 2: -0.4 m/s, Heat 3: -0.1 m/s, Heat 4: +0.2 m/s, Heat 5: 0.0 m/s, Heat 6: -0.1 m/s, Heat 7: -0.2 m/s, Heat 8: +0.7 m/s

Quarterfinals
Qualification: First three in each heat (Q) and the next four fastest (q) qualified for the semifinals.

Wind:Heat 1: +0.7 m/s, Heat 2: +0.4 m/s, Heat 3: -0.4 m/s, Heat 4: -0.1 m/s

Semifinals

Qualification: First four of each semifinal qualified directly (Q) for the final.

Wind:Heat 1: +0.5 m/s, Heat 2: -0.5 m/s

Final

Wind: -0.7 m/s

References 
Heats results
Quarterfinals results
Semifinals results
Final results

100
2011 in women's athletics
2011